Bayside is a development, currently under construction, located on the eastern approach to Worthing town centre in West Sussex, England.   Designed by Allies and Morrison, it consists of two main buildings, the tallest of which, Bayside Vista, is a 15-storey tower that reaches  and is the tallest building in Worthing.  It replaced the Aquarena swimming pool.

It is bounded by Brighton Road to the north, Splashpoint Leisure Centre to the west, Merton Road to the east and the town's seafront and beach to the south. Views extend southwards across the English Channel and the Bay of Sussex and northwards towards the South Downs.

Construction began in November 2017 and the building was topped out on 1 October 2019.  It was completed in 2022.

History

2015 original scheme
Roffey Homes originally proposed a 21-storey £40 million tower on the site.  Planning permission was rejected by Worthing Borough Council in September 2015.

2017 revised scheme
Roffey appointed new architects, Allies and Morrison, in November 2015. Bayside Vista is a 15-storey tower while Bayside Horizon is much lower and fronts Brighton Road. Once approved, Peter Bottomley, MP for Worthing West called for a Government inquiry into the plans but the Secretary of State for Housing, Communities and Local Government, Sajid Javid declined the request to intervene.

Architecture
Designed to act as a counterpoint to the horizontal massing of the adjacent Splashpoint Leisure Centre, Bayside acts as a marker of the start of the town centre esplanade and beach, with a lantern-like structure.  According to Ben Cheal of Roffey Homes, the design from Allies and Morrison incorporates features from historic buildings in Worthing.  Writing in the Architects' Journal, Ella Braidwood called the overall design of Bayside 'playful' and described the Bayside Vista tower as 'curvaceous'.

Bayside Social
Masterchef winner Kenny Tutt opened his second Worthing restaurant, called Bayside Social at Bayside in 2021.

Ranking among Worthing high-rise buildings
Bayside Vista is the tallest tower in Worthing.

Previous uses of the site

 The Aquarena Swimming Pool opened in 1968 as Worthing's main indoor swimming pool, replacing the West Worthing Baths in Heene Road.  Designed by John Attenborough the pool was closed in 2013 and demolished in 2018.
 Grounds of Beach House - in the 19th and early 20th centuries the site was part of the extensive grounds of Beach House.  The site, along with the rest of Beach House and its grounds was sold at auction to Percy Brazier for £16,000.  Brazier then sold the site to Worthing Council for the same price of £16,000.

See also
 Beach House, Worthing
 Splashpoint Leisure Centre
 Teville Gate
 List of tallest buildings by United Kingdom settlement

References

Buildings and structures in Worthing